Jinyang Lake is a reservoir covering portions of Jinju and Sacheon in Gyeongsangnam-do, South Korea.  The water surface covers approximately 29 km².  It was formed in 1970, by the construction of a dam where the Gyeongho and Deokcheon rivers join to form the Nam River.

Most of the Jinju side of the lake is a city park, which was established in 1998.  The area has become a popular local attraction, with hotels, restaurants, a small zoo, and the Jinju Land amusement park.

Jinyang Lake, like several other regions in the Nakdong River basin, is home to a population of endangered Eurasian otters.

External links
Official park office website, in Korean 

Lakes of South Korea
Parks in South Gyeongsang Province
Landforms of South Gyeongsang Province
Jinju
Sacheon
Reservoirs in South Korea